Quad as a word or prefix usually means 'four'. It may refer to:

Government
 Quadrilateral Security Dialogue, a strategic security dialogue between Australia, India, Japan, and the United States
 Quadrilateral group, an informal group which includes the trade spokesmen of the United States, Japan, Canada, and the European Union
 Quad Cities, a group of five cities straddling the boundary between the U.S. states of Iowa and Illinois
 The "Quad", the senior members of the Cameron–Clegg coalition government in the United Kingdom from 2010 to 2015

Art and entertainment
 Matthias Quad (1557–1613), engraver and cartographer
 Quad (film), 2015
 Quad (music), a musical project by Gary Ramon
 Quad (play), by Samuel Beckett
 The Quad (TV series), 2017
 Quad (arts centre), in Derby, United Kingdom
 Quad Cinema, art house in New York City, New York
 Quad (company), formerly Quad/Graphics, an American printing company
 Quadruple combination, the four books that comprise the canon of the LDS church

Medicine and anatomy
 Quadriplegic, a person paralyzed in all four limbs
 Quadriceps femoris, a large leg muscle group
 Quadruplets, four children from a multiple birth

Sports
 Quad (figure skating), a figure skating jump with four revolutions
 Quad scull, a boat configuration of four rowers
 Quad skates, roller skates with two wheels on each of two axles
 Quad, one of the divisions in wheelchair tennis
 Quadruple-double, a statistical accomplishment in basketball 
 Quadrennium, the 4-year training cycle between Olympic games

Transportation
 Quad bike or all-terrain vehicle, a vehicle that travels on low-pressure tires
 Quad, a tandem bicycle with four seats
 Quadracycle, a four-wheeled human-powered land vehicle
 Jeffery Quad, a four-wheel drive truck
 Quadcopter, a four-rotor helicopter
 Quad, a chairlift in skiing which carries four persons
 Quad, or railroad speeder, a motorized vehicle used for maintenance on railroads
 Quad (rocket), an autonomous rocket by Armadillo Aerospace

Technology
 QUAD (cipher), a stream cipher
 QUaD, a microwave telescope at the South Pole
 Quad antenna, a directional antenna
 Quad Electroacoustics, a British manufacturer of audio equipment
 Quadraphonic sound, four-channel sound
 Quadruplex videotape, video tape format
 Quad Flat Package, a type of package for surface mounted integrated circuit
 Star quad cable, four insulated conductors twisted together

Other uses
 Quad (unit), unit of energy, short for quadrillion, 1015 BTU
 Quadrangle (architecture), a space or courtyard bordered by buildings
 Quad (geography), a United States Geological Survey topographical map
 Quad (typography), a spacer used in letterpress type
 Quadrilateral, in geometry
 Quad poster, a common UK size of film poster
 Quadrat, in ecology, a small study area or a frame used to define it
 Quadrupel, a Belgian beer
 The Quad Resort and Casino, on the Las Vegas Strip
 Four-of-a-kind in poker

See also
 Quadrangle (disambiguation)